The 1936 Big Ten Conference football season was the 41st season of college football played by the member schools of the Big Ten Conference (also known as the Western Conference) and was a part of the 1936 college football season.

The 1936 Minnesota Golden Gophers football team, under head coach Bernie Bierman, compiled a 7–1 record and was ranked No. 1 in the final AP Poll, giving Minnesota its third consecutive national championship. Tackle Ed Widseth was a consensus first-team All-American and was the first Big Ten player taken in the 1937 NFL Draft with the fourth overall pick.

The 1936 Northwestern Wildcats football team, under head coach Pappy Waldorf, compiled a 7–1 record, won the Big Ten championship, and was ranked No. 7 in the final AP Poll. The team's only loss came on the last day of the season against Notre Dame. Guard Steve Reid was a consensus first-team All-American.

The 1936 Ohio State Buckeyes football team, under head coach Francis Schmidt, compiled a 5–3 record, led the Big Ten in scoring defense (3.4 points allowed per game), and outscored opponents 160 to 27. End Merle Wendt, tackle Charley Hamrick, and guard Inwood Smith were first-team All-Big Ten players.

Season overview

Results and team statistics

Key
PPG = Average of points scored per game
PAG = Average of points allowed per game
MVP = Most valuable player as voted by players on each team as part of the voting process to determine the winner of the Chicago Tribune Silver Football trophy

Regular season

Bowl games
No Big Ten teams participated in any bowl games during the 1936 season.

All-Big Ten players

The following players were picked by the Associated Press (AP) and/or the United Press (UP) as first-team players on the 1936 All-Big Ten Conference football team.

All-Americans

Two Big Ten players were selected as consensus first-team players on the 1936 College Football All-America Team. They were:

Other Big Ten players received first-team honors from at least one selector. They were:

1937 NFL Draft
The following Big Ten players were among the first 100 players selected in the 1937 NFL Draft:

References